The men's 1500 metres event at the 1990 Commonwealth Games was held on 2 and 3 February at the Mount Smart Stadium in Auckland.

Medalists

Results

Heats
Qualification: First 5 of each heat (Q) and the next 2 fastest (q) qualified for the final.

Final

References

1500
1990